WVHA may refer to:

 SS-WVHA, or SS-Wirtschafts-Verwaltungshauptamt, the Economic and Administrative Main Office of the Nazi SS
 West Virginia Hospital Association
 West Volusia Hospital Authority
 Windows Vista Hardware Assessment
 Winnipeg Video Hockey Association